José David Cabello Rondón was appointed Venezuelan Minister of Infrastructure in July 2006. In February 2008 he became the head of SENIAT, the Venezuelan tax agency. He had previously been head of Conviasa (from April to June 2006).

Sanctions 

The government of Canada sanctioned Cabello as being someone who participated in "significant acts of corruption or who have been involved in serious violations of human rights". On 18 May 2018, the Office of Foreign Assets Control (OFAC) of the United States Department of the Treasury placed sanctions in effect against Cabello. OFAC stated that Cabello would use his position in SENIAT for extortion and money laundering.

Personal life 

He is the brother of Diosdado Cabello.

References

Living people
1969 births
Government ministers of Venezuela
United Socialist Party of Venezuela politicians